Marketing.xml is a standard used for importing marketing data into a data warehouse and was developed by Digital Jigsaw, part of the Mobile Interactive Group. The standard was initially created in November 2010.

References

XML-based standards
Marketing software